Didrichsen Art Museum is an art museum in Helsinki, Finland.

History

The art museum was founded by Marie-Louise and Gunnar Didrichsen, who asked Finnish architect Viljo Revell to build the first of two phases in 1958 and again in 1965.

Revell also request the complex to have a sculpture, Archer, added by Henry Moore in 1967; Moore and Revell worked together in the design of Toronto City Hall, which also features the Archer sculpture.

The modernist buildings are built to the contours of the land and surrounded by trees.

Location

The museum is located on the island of Kuusisaari. The founders have since died and are buried within the compound of the museum.

Further reading
 Minna Törmä, Nordic Private Collections of Chinese Objects (Routledge, 2020).

References

External links
 http://www.didrichsenmuseum.fi/eng/

Museums in Helsinki
Art museums and galleries in Finland
Mesoamerican art museums
Munkkiniemi
1965 establishments in Finland
Museums established in 1965